The Duke at Tanglewood is a live album by American pianist, composer and bandleader Duke Ellington fronting the Boston Pops Orchestra conducted by Arthur Fiedler which was recorded at Tanglewood and released on RCA Victor's classical Red Seal label.

Reception

The Allmusic review by Scott Yanow stated: "Ellington's piano is fine throughout this LP but unfortunately the arrangements were written by Richard Hayman and are hilariously overblown and pompous; "Caravan" is an unintentional scream. Those Ellington collectors without a strong sense of humor are obliged to skip this odd greatest-hits performance".

Track listing
All compositions by Duke Ellington except where noted
 "Caravan" (Juan Tizol, Duke Ellington, Irving Mills) – 4:48
 "Mood Indigo" (Ellington, Barney Bigard, Mills) – 3:00
 "The Mooch" (Ellington, Mills) – 3:29
 "Love Scene" – 2:31
 "I Let a Song Go Out of My Heart" (Ellington, Mills, Henry Nemo, John Redmond) – 2:52
 "I'm Beginning to See the Light" (Ellington, Don George, Johnny Hodges, Harry James) – 2:43
 "Do Nothing till You Hear from Me" (Ellington, Bob Russell) – 2:45
 "Sophisticated Lady" (Ellington, Mills, Mitchell Parish) – 3:23
 "Timon of Athens March" – 3:07
 "Solitude" (Ellington, Eddie DeLange, Mills) - 3:02
 "I Got It Bad (and That Ain't Good)" (Ellington, Paul Francis Webster) – 4:11
 "Satin Doll" (Ellington, Billy Strayhorn, Johnny Mercer) – 2:32

Personnel
Duke Ellington – piano, arranger on track 9
Boston Pops Orchestra conducted by Arthur Fiedler
Richard Hayman – arranger on tracks 1-5, 7-8, 10-12
Patrick Hollenbeck - arranger on track 6

References

1966 live albums
RCA Records live albums
Duke Ellington live albums
Arthur Fiedler albums